Mars 2112 (pronounced "Mars twenty-one twelve") was one of many tourist-targeted restaurants in the Times Square district of New York City, based on future space travel and accommodations. At , it was the largest such themed restaurant when it opened in November 1998. 
Businessmen and founders Paschal M. Phelan and Simon Deith claimed at its opening, "It's the fusion of fun and good food and fantasy." 

The restaurant was situated on a sunken courtyard in front of the Paramount Plaza building at Broadway and 51st Street. A UFO-like elevator took patrons to the dining tier, where the "Mars Bar" and "Space Arcade" were also located. Perhaps the most notable feature was Crystal Crater, which served as the dining area. It was three stories high, and decorated as an imaginary Mars underground landscape. Waiters dressed in futuristic costumes, and food and drink items had space-themed names. After dining, patrons passed through two doorways where a "teleporter" took them back to the main floor and the gift shop. The restaurant closed in January 2012. The restaurant was auctioned off by Eliot B. Millman and Michael Amodeo auction companies. It had previously filed for bankruptcy twice (once in 2002 and once in late 2007) before finally closing.

A Mars 2112 restaurant opened at Woodfield Mall in Schaumburg, Illinois, on October 3, 2000.  It closed in November 2001, for no publicly-stated reason.

References

External links
Official website (archived December 5, 2011)

Midtown Manhattan
Defunct restaurants in New York City
Outer space-themed restaurants
Restaurants established in 1998
2012 disestablishments in New York (state)
1998 establishments in New York City
Outer space in amusement parks